Professor Richard D. Oram F.S.A. (Scot.) is a Scottish historian. He is a professor of medieval and environmental history at the University of Stirling and an honorary lecturer in history at the University of Aberdeen. He is also the director of the Centre for Environmental History and Policy at the University of Stirling.

He received his undergraduate training at the University of St. Andrews, where he also carried out his doctoral research, on medieval Galloway. In 2000 he published The Lordship of Galloway (Birlinn). He has since written a biography of King David I of Scotland (Tempus, 2004), and the High Medieval volume, volume 3, in the New Edinburgh History of Scotland series, entitled Domination and Lordship: Scotland, 1070-1230 (2011).

In June 2014, Oram was appointed president of the Scottish Castles Association, a registered charity.

Selected works
 (2000) The Lordship of Galloway. John Donald. 
 (2004) David I : the king who made Scotland. Tempus. 
 (2011) Domination and Lordship: Scotland, 1070-1230. Edinburgh University Press.  (hardback),  (paperback)

Collaborations
 with Richard Fawcett: (2004) Melrose Abbey. Tempus.

References

 Staff Profile Page (University of Stirling)

Living people
Year of birth missing (living people)
Academics of the University of Stirling
Alumni of the University of St Andrews
British medievalists
21st-century Scottish historians
Castellologists